The 2023 Australian Open was a Grand Slam level tennis tournament held at Melbourne Park, from 16–29 January 2023. It was the 111th edition of the Australian Open, the 55th in the Open Era, and the first major of the year. The tournament consisted of events for professional players in singles, doubles and mixed doubles. Junior and wheelchair players competed in singles and doubles tournaments. During previous years, the tournament's main sponsor was Kia.

Novak Djokovic claimed the men's singles title, his tenth Australian Open title and 22nd major title overall, tying Rafael Nadal's all-time record. Djokovic was allowed to play this year despite remaining unvaccinated from COVID-19 after his three-year ban was lifted. The ban was initially handed to him after he was deported in 2022, as Australia's laws required foreigners to be vaccinated for entering the country when the tournament was played in 2022, but the ban was lifted as the vaccination requirement has been lifted. Nadal was the defending champion, but lost to Mackenzie McDonald in the second round. Aryna Sabalenka won the women's title, her first major singles title. Ashleigh Barty was the reigning champion in the women's singles, but she retired from the sport in March 2022.

Spectators returned to full capacity for the first time since 2020, targeting to exceed 900,000 fans, after capacity restrictions in the last two events due to the COVID-19 pandemic.

With the elimination of world No. 1 Iga Świątek in the fourth round by Elena Rybakina, this became the first edition of the Australian Open in the Open Era to feature neither of the top two singles seeds of either gender in the quarterfinals.

Singles players 
 Men's singles

 Women's singles

Events

Men's singles

  Novak Djokovic def.  Stefanos Tsitsipas, 6–3, 7–6(7–4), 7–6(7–5)

Women's singles

  Aryna Sabalenka def.  Elena Rybakina, 4–6, 6–3, 6–4

Men's doubles

  Rinky Hijikata /  Jason Kubler def.  Hugo Nys /  Jan Zieliński, 6–4, 7–6(7–4)

Women's doubles

  Barbora Krejčíková /  Kateřina Siniaková def.  Shuko Aoyama /  Ena Shibahara 6–4, 6–3

Mixed doubles

  Luisa Stefani /  Rafael Matos def.  Sania Mirza /  Rohan Bopanna, 7–6(7–2), 6–2

Wheelchair men's singles

  Alfie Hewett def.  Tokito Oda, 6–3, 6–1

Wheelchair women's singles

  Diede de Groot def.  Yui Kamiji, 0–6, 6–2, 6–2

Wheelchair quad singles

  Sam Schröder def.  Niels Vink, 6–2, 7–5

Wheelchair men's doubles

  Alfie Hewett /  Gordon Reid def.  Maikel Scheffers /  Ruben Spaargaren, 6–1, 6–2

Wheelchair women's doubles

  Diede de Groot /  Aniek van Koot def.  Yui Kamiji /  Zhu Zhenzhen, 6–3, 6–2

Wheelchair quad doubles

  Sam Schröder /  Niels Vink def.  Donald Ramphadi /  Ymanitu Silva, 6–1, 6–3

Boys' singles

  Alexander Blockx def.  Learner Tien, 6–1, 2–6, 7–6(11–9)

Girls' singles

  Alina Korneeva def.  Mirra Andreeva, 6–7(2–7), 6–4, 7–5

Boys' doubles

  Learner Tien /  Cooper Williams def.  Alexander Blockx /  João Fonseca, 6–4, 6–4

Girls' doubles

  Renáta Jamrichová /  Federica Urgesi def.  Hayu Kinoshita /  Sara Saito, 7–6(7–5), 1–6, [10–7]

Point distribution and prize money

Point distribution 
Below is a series of tables for each competition showing the ranking points offered for each event.

Senior points

Wheelchair points

Junior points

Prize money 
The Australian Open total prize money for 2023 increased by 3.38% year on year to a tournament record A$76,500,000. This represented a 155% increase in prize money over the last ten years, from the A$30 million on offer in 2013.

Controversy 
In the wake of the 2022 Russian invasion of Ukraine, organizers from the tournament banned Russian and Belarusian flags from being displayed courtside. Nations' flags were initially allowed, but this was reversed after an incident between Russia's Kamilla Rakhimova and Ukraine's Kateryna Baindl. During the game, Russian supporters were accused of taunting Baindl, but the group denied that they were being provocative. They stated that they were merely supporting Rakhimova. 

The move came after Russian and Belarusian players were banned from playing under their nation's flags.

References

External links 

 Australian Open official website

 
2023 ATP Tour 
2023 in Australian tennis 
2023 in tennis
Australian Open
2023 WTA Tour